Claire Martin, OBE (born 6 September 1967) is an English jazz singer.

Music career
Martin was born in Colliers Wood, London. She grew up in a house "full of music" thanks to jazz-loving parents. She cites Ella Fitzgerald's Song Books as the inspiration to study singing at the Doris Holford Stage School and in New York and London. Her professional career began at the age of 19 when she sang in a hotel band in at the Savoy Hotel after auditioning to be a bluecoat Bournemouth. For two years, she worked aboard the cruise ship Queen Elizabeth, where she sang in the piano bar.

When she was 21, she formed her own jazz quartet. In 1991, she was signed by the Scottish jazz label Linn Records and her debut album, The Waiting Game, was released in 1992. Later that year, she opened for Tony Bennett at the Glasgow International Jazz Festival.

Martin has performed all over Europe and Asia with her trio and, until his death in 2012, with Richard Rodney Bennett in an intimate cabaret duo setting in England and in America. They played to sell-out crowds at venues including the Algonquin Hotel in New York City. She has been a featured soloist with the Halle Orchestra, the Royal Liverpool Philharmonic, the RTÉ Concert Orchestra, the BBC Big Band, and the BBC Concert Orchestra. She has co-presented BBC Radio 3's Jazz Line Up since 2000 and has interviewed many of her musical heroes, such as Pat Metheny, Michael Brecker, Brad Mehldau, and André Previn. She has collaborated with Martin Taylor, John Martyn, Stéphane Grappelli, Kenny Barron, Richard Rodney Bennett, Jim Mullen and Nigel Hitchcock.

She toured extensively throughout the UK, Scandinavia, Russia, and China, appearing with the Royal Liverpool Philharmonic and her trio. In 2011, she made her debut at Lincoln Center in New York City with pianist Bill Charlap and performed at the Algonquin Hotel for a three-week residency with Rodney Bennett.

Martin recorded with jazz pianist Kenny Barron on Too Much in Love to Care (Linn, 2011). In 2013, she toured with her show, The Two of U, and worked with conductor John Wilson, Joe Stilgoe, Mark McGann, and the Royal Liverpool Philharmonic, celebrating the music of Paul McCartney and John Lennon.

Martin collaborated with the Montpellier Cello Quartet, performing arrangements written for her by Rodney Bennett, Mark Anthony Turnage, and Django Bates. This chamber jazz ensemble toured throughout 2014 to promote the album Time and Place, which featured singer and pianist Joe Stilgoe, who became Martin's cabaret partner.

In August 2020 Martin also sang several songs in the BBC Radio 2 show, Sunday Night is Music Night (Sinatraland) which was dedicated to the music of Frank Sinatra.

Awards and honors
 Best Vocalist, British Jazz Awards, 2009, 2010
 Best New Recording, Too Much in Love to Care, British Jazz Awards, 2012
 Officer of the Order of the British Empire (OBE), 2011

Discography
 The Waiting Game (Linn, 1992)
 Devil May Care (Linn, 1993)
 Old Boyfriends (Linn, 1994)
 Off Beat (Linn, 1995)
 Make This City Ours (Linn, 1997)
 Take My Heart (Linn, 1999)
 Perfect Alibi (Linn, 2000)
 Too Darn Hot! (Universal, 2002)
 Secret Love (Linn, 2004)
 Girl Talk with Barb Jungr, Mari Wilson (Linn, 2005)
 When Lights Are Low (Linn, 2005)
 He Never Mentioned Love (Linn, 2007)
 A Modern Art (Linn, 2009)
 Witchcraft (2010)
 Too Much in Love to Care (Linn, 2012)
 Say It Isn't So (2013)
 Bumpin'  with Jim Mullen (Stunt, 2018)
 Believin' It (Linn, 2019)

References

External links
 Linn Records
 Conversation between Richard Rodney Bennett and Claire Martin – British Library sound recording

1967 births
BBC Radio 3 presenters
English women singers
English jazz singers
Living people
People from Wimbledon, London
British women jazz singers
Officers of the Order of the British Empire
British women radio presenters